Chupa may refer to:
Chupa (2023 film)
Chupa (inhabited locality), several inhabited localities in Russia
Chupa District, Peru
Chupá, a corregimiento in Los Santos Province, Panama
an alternative spelling of chuppah, a Jewish wedding canopy
an alternative spelling of chuba, a Tibetan robe
original name of Helium, an American alternative rock band
Chupa, a vampire in the 2002 film Blade II
Licania platypus, a tree species native to Central America

See also 
 Chupa Chups, a Spanish brand of lollipop and other confectionery